Gelora Ratu Pamelingan Stadium or Gelora Madura is a stadium in Tlanakan, Pamekasan Regency, East Java, Indonesia. It is mostly used for football matches and is the new home stadium of Madura United.

References

Buildings and structures in East Java
Multi-purpose stadiums in Indonesia
Football venues in Indonesia
Football venues in East Java
Athletics (track and field) venues in East Java
Madura United F.C.
Sports venues completed in 2016